Howard Lynn Matthews (February 14, 1889 – February 27, 1975), usually known as Matty Matthews or H. L. Matthews, was a minor league baseball player and coach of several sports at The Citadel, The Military College of South Carolina. His son Clay became head of a long family line of standout National Football League players.

Early life
Matthews was born in Jeffersonville, Ohio on February 14, 1889.  He played baseball for several minor league teams from 1912 through 1915, primarily in the South Atlantic League. With the onset of World War I, he enlisted in the United States Army, where he began boxing. After the war, he returned to baseball for the 1922 season and briefly pursued a career as a stock market telegrapher. In 1925, Matthews began coaching athletics at The Citadel.

Coaching career
Matthews rotated as coach of baseball, track and field, and boxing at The Citadel from 1926-1941.  Matthews was part of the inaugural class of inductees into The Citadel Athletic Hall of Fame in 1977.  He was also inducted in the Carolinas Boxing Hall of Fame in 2005.

Head coaching record

Baseball
Matthews's record as head coach of The Citadel baseball team is incomplete. Only two seasons have complete records, one each during his two stints as coach of the baseball team.

Boxing

Track and field
No records are available for Matthews' tenure as track and field coach at The Citadel.

References

External links

1889 births
1975 deaths
People from Fayette County, Ohio
The Citadel Bulldogs baseball coaches
The Citadel Bulldogs boxing coaches
The Citadel Bulldogs track and field coaches
Matthews football family